"Just a Little Bit" is a song by American rock band Blue Cheer featured on the album Outsideinside. It is one of two Blue Cheer songs to chart on the Billboard Hot 100, peaking at number 92, and number 69 in Canada. The band did a remake of the song for their album What Doesn't Kill You...  Drummer Neil Peart of Rush later used one of the drum patterns from the song for the ending of their cover of "Summertime Blues".

References

Blue Cheer songs
1968 songs
Philips Records singles